Kiryat Atidim is a high tech district of Tel Aviv, Israel.

History
Kiryat Atidim is located in North East of Tel Aviv near the Petah Tikva industrial zone. The zone was opened in 1972 as a project of Tel Aviv University and Tel Aviv City Hall.

References

External links 
 Kiryat Atidim website

Neighborhoods of Tel Aviv
Science parks in Israel
High-technology business districts in Israel